Bowman Farm is a historic home located near Boones Mill, Franklin County, Virginia.  The original dwelling was built about 1833, and is the two-story rear wing with a Georgian style interior.  Appended to the east gable-end of the original house is a two-story center-passage-plan frame section dating to about 1900. Both sections have metal-sheathed gable roofs.  The house was renovated in 1999.  Also on the property are a contributing log bank barn, frame barn, granary, and family cemetery.

It was listed on the National Register of Historic Places in 2000.

References

Houses on the National Register of Historic Places in Virginia
Houses completed in 1833
Georgian architecture in Virginia
Houses in Franklin County, Virginia
National Register of Historic Places in Franklin County, Virginia